Patrick J. McNulty (1922–1997) was a judge of the United States Bankruptcy Court for the District of Minnesota from 1968-1975 and a United States magistrate judge of the United States District Court for the District of Minnesota from 1978 until his death in 1997. McNulty received his B.S.L. (1947) and J.D. (1948) (summa cum laude, Order of the Coif) from the University of Minnesota Law School. He was admitted to the Minnesota Bar in 1949. McNulty clerked for Minnesota Supreme Court Justice Frank Gallagher from 1949-1950 before entering practice. Interrupting his undergraduate education, McNulty had served as a fighter pilot with the U.S. Army Air Force during World War II and until shortly thereafter (1943-1946). Patrick J. McNulty and his wife from 1952 Gladys Bird LaFave were of the Roman Catholic faith. After retiring as a magistrate, he continued to work as a special master in the District of Minnesota, but his behavior became erratic, including an arrest for shoplifting cigarettes and accusations of other shoplifting incidents.

See also
 Federal judiciary of the United States

References

1922 births
1997 deaths
Judges of the United States bankruptcy courts
University of Minnesota Law School alumni
20th-century American judges